Silke Scheuermann (born 15 June 1973, in Karlsruhe) is a German poet and novelist. She was educated in Frankfurt, Leipzig, and Paris. She is best known for her debut novel Die Stunde zwischen Hund und Wolf (The Hour Between Dog and Wolf), which has been translated into ten languages including English. She has won numerous German and European literary prizes and fellowships, including the Georg-Christoph-Lichtenberg-Preis, the Leonce-und-Lena-Preis, the Hölty Prize, the Bertolt-Brecht-Literaturpreis, and a Villa Massimo fellowship.

Works

English translations

Awards 

 2001 Leonce-und-Lena-Preis, Darmstadt
 2003 Literaturstipendium Lana
 2003 Stipendium Künstlerdorf Schöppingen
 2004 Stadtschreiberin in Beirut
 2004 Literaturstipendium Villa Aurora, Los Angeles
 2004 Stipendium der Kunststiftung Baden-Württemberg
 2005 Dresdner Stadtschreiberin
 2005 Förderpreis zum Hermann-Hesse-Preis
 2006 Studienaufenthalt in der Casa Baldi in Olevano Romano bei Rom
 2006 Stipendium Künstlerdorf Schreyahn
 2006 New York-Stipendium Deutscher Literaturfonds
 2007 Förderpreis zum Grimmelshausen-Preis
 2008 George-Konell-Preis
 2009 Stipendium Villa Massimo
 2009 Förderpreis zum Droste-Preis
 2012 Stipendium Goethe-Institut Villa Kamogawa, Kyoto
 2012 Poetikdozentur: junge Autoren der Hochschule RheinMain, WS 2012/13
 2013/2014 Stipendium des Internationalen Künstlerhauses Villa Concordia in Bamberg
 2014 Hölty-Preis
 2014 Stipendium im Rahmen des Hausacher Leselenz
 2016 Bertolt-Brecht-Literaturpreis
 2016 Robert-Gernhardt-Preis für das Lyrikprojekt Zweites Buch der Unruhe
 2017 Georg-Christoph-Lichtenberg-Preis, für ihr literarisches Gesamtwerk unter besonderer Berücksichtigung ihres Romans Wovon wir lebten
 2019 Goethe Plaque of the City of Frankfurt

References

21st-century German novelists
German poets
1973 births
Living people
German women novelists
German women poets
21st-century German women writers